Andersson's Kalle on Top Form (Swedish: Anderssonskans Kalle i busform) is a 1973 Swedish comedy film directed by Arne Stivell and starring Sickan Carlsson, Sten-Åke Cederhök and Britta Holmberg. It is a sequel to the 1972 film Andersson's Kalle which was itself based on the 1901 novel of the same title by Emil Norlander.

Cast
 Tord Tjädersten as Kalle
 Sickan Carlsson as 	Anderssonskan
 Sten-Åke Cederhök as Jonsson
 Britta Holmberg as Pilgrenskan
 Per-Axel Arosenius as 	Teacher
 Hans Backlund as 	Policeman
 Inger Berggren as 	Cinema Cashier
 Barbro Bergius as 	Britt's Mother
 Gösta Bergqvist as Crook
 Erik Brander as 	Accordion Guy
 Gus Dahlström as 	School Janitor
 Jan Olof Danielsson as 	Stubben
 Nils Eklöv as Blaster
 Bertil Eriksson as Cinema Projectionist
 Lauritz Falk as Britt's Father
 Ragnar Frisk as 	Cinema Usher
 Leif Hellberg as 	Crook
 Rune Karlsson as Mover
 Lars Lennartsson as 	Valet
 Olle Leth as Police Commissioner
 Åke Lidcrantz as 	Store Clerk
 Tommy Lundell as 	Fritte
 Maria Petters-Gustafsson as 	Britt
 Hjördis Petterson as 	Mrs. Nilsson
 Arne Stivell as 	Head Teacher
 Leopold Svedberg as 	Old Man with Beard
 Magnus Tigerholm as 	Journalist
 Gunnel Wadner as Maid
 Chris Wahlström as 	Bobergskan
 James Wallén as 	Policeman
 Bengt Olof Wennerberg as 	Old Man at Cinema
 Åke Wästersjö as Mover

References

Bibliography 
 Holmstrom, John. The Moving Picture Boy: An International Encyclopaedia from 1895 to 1995, Norwich, Michael Russell, 1996

External links 
 

1973 films
Swedish comedy films
1973 comedy films
1970s Swedish-language films
Films directed by Arne Stivell
Films based on Swedish novels
Swedish sequel films
Films set in Stockholm
1970s Swedish films